Events from the year 1903 in Canada.

Incumbents

Crown 
 Monarch – Edward VII

Federal government 
 Governor General – Gilbert Elliot-Murray-Kynynmound, 4th Earl of Minto
 Prime Minister – Wilfrid Laurier
 Chief Justice – Henri Elzéar Taschereau (Quebec)
 Parliament – 9th

Provincial governments

Lieutenant governors 
Lieutenant Governor of British Columbia – Henri-Gustave Joly de Lotbinière
Lieutenant Governor of Manitoba – Daniel Hunter McMillan
Lieutenant Governor of New Brunswick – Jabez Bunting Snowball 
Lieutenant Governor of Nova Scotia – Alfred Gilpin Jones    
Lieutenant Governor of Ontario – Oliver Mowat (until April 19) then William Mortimer Clark (from April 21)
Lieutenant Governor of Prince Edward Island – Peter Adolphus McIntyre  
Lieutenant Governor of Quebec – Louis-Amable Jetté

Premiers 
Premier of British Columbia – Edward Gawler Prior (until June 1) then Richard McBride  
Premier of Manitoba – Rodmond Roblin  
Premier of New Brunswick – Lemuel John Tweedie
Premier of Nova Scotia – George Henry Murray 
Premier of Ontario – George William Ross    
Premier of Prince Edward Island – Arthur Peters 
Premier of Quebec – Simon-Napoléon Parent

Territorial governments

Commissioners 
 Commissioner of Yukon – Zachary Taylor Wood (acting) (until March 4) then Frederick Tennyson Congdon

Lieutenant governors 
 Lieutenant Governor of Keewatin – Daniel Hunter McMillan
 Lieutenant Governor of the North-West Territories – Amédée E. Forget

Premiers 
 Premier of North-West Territories – Frederick Haultain

Events

 March 22 – Because of a drought, the U.S. side of Niagara Falls runs short of water 
 March 1 – Henri Bourassa's Ligue nationaliste is founded
 March 25 – The Alaska Boundary Dispute is settled in the United States' favour
 April 29 – The Frank Slide, The most destructive landslide in Canadian history, kills 70 in Frank, District of Alberta, North-West Territories
 June 1 – Richard McBride becomes Premier of British Columbia, replacing Edward Prior
 June 19 – Regina, District of Assiniboia, North-West Territories, is incorporated as a city 
 June 24 – Ignace Bourget Monument unveiled 
 July 1 – Ray Knight builds the Raymond Stampede rodeo arena and rodeo grandstands in Raymond, District of Alberta, North-West Territories, which are the first ever built in the world.

Arts and literature

See also
 List of Canadian films

Births

January to June
January 3 – Charles Foulkes, General, first Chairman of the Chiefs of Staff, negotiated the WWII Nazi surrender in the Netherlands (d.1969)
February 15 – Sarto Fournier, politician and mayor of Montreal (d.1980) 
February 16 – Georges-Henri Lévesque, Dominican priest and sociologist (d.2000)
February 22 – Morley Callaghan, novelist, short story writer, playwright, and television and radio personality (d.1990)
February 25 – King Clancy, ice hockey player (d.1986)
May 23 – Elsie Gibbons, politician, first women to be elected mayor of a municipality in Quebec (d.2003)
June 10 – Alexander Wallace Matheson, politician and Premier of Prince Edward Island (d.1976)
June 23 – Paul Martin Sr., politician (d.1992)
June 30 – Donald Ferguson Brown, politician, barrister and lawyer

July to December
July 16 – Carmen Lombardo, singer and composer (d.1971)
July 30 
Harold Ballard, owner of the Toronto Maple Leafs (d.1990)
Alan Macnaughton, politician (d.1999)
August 31 – Helen Battle, zoologist
December 8 – Louis-Marie Régis, philosopher, theologian, scholar and member of the Dominican Order (d.1988)

Deaths

January 7 – Robert Atkinson Davis, businessman, politician and 4th Premier of Manitoba (b. 1841)
July 2 – Oliver Mowat, politician, 3rd Premier of Ontario and 8th Lieutenant Governor of Ontario (b. 1820)
April 30 – Emily Stowe, first female doctor to practice in Canada and women's rights and suffrage activist (b. 1831)
May 6 – Samuel Bridgeland, politician (b. 1847)
May 8 – David Mills, politician, author, poet and jurist (b. 1831)
June 26 – Donald Farquharson, politician and Premier of Prince Edward Island (b. 1834)
November 12 – William Doran, mayor of Hamilton, Ontario (b. 1834)
November 14 – John Andrew Davidson, politician (b. 1852)

Historical documents
Alberta farmer's examples of being "most unmercifully fleeced by those iniquitous tariffs" include taxes on blankets, clothing, tools, kitchenware etc.

Disastrous landslide at Frank, Alberta described

Saint John Globe correspondent covers canoe trip down Saint John River above Fredericton, N.B.

Halifax Morning Chronicle correspondent provides humorous profile of New Westminster, B.C.

Gold, fraud and foxes in news from New Bay, Notre Dame Bay, Newfoundland

Despite late planting and her husband working off-farm, newly immigrated woman and sons bring in successful harvest in Saskatchewan

Explorer's last words as he starves to death on Labrador expedition that his wife later completes

References

 
Years of the 20th century in Canada
Canada
Canada